Musivavis (meaning "mosaic bird") is a genus of euenantiornithine bird from the Early Cretaceous (Aptian) Jiufotang Formation of Liaoning Province, China. The genus contains a single species, Musivavis amabilis, known from a nearly complete, articulated skeleton.

Discovery and naming 
The Musivavis holotype specimen, MHGU-3000, was discovered in a layer of the Jiufotang Formation of Chaoyang, Liaoning Province, China. This specimen consists of a nearly complete specimen, preserved on a single slab.

In 2022, Wang et al. described Musivavis amabilis, a new genus and species of enantiornthine, based on these fossil remains. The generic name, "Musivavis", combines the Latin "musivum", meaning "mosaic", and "avis", meaning "bird". The specific name, "amabilis", is a Latin word meaning "lovely" or "beautiful", in reference to the preservation quality of the holotype.

References 

Enantiornitheans
Prehistoric bird genera
Extinct birds of Asia
Mesozoic birds of Asia
Fossil taxa described in 2022
Birds described in 2022